The anterior segment or anterior cavity is the front third of the eye that includes the structures in front of the vitreous humour: the cornea, iris, ciliary body, and lens.

Within the anterior segment are two fluid-filled spaces:
 the anterior chamber between the posterior surface of the cornea (i.e. the corneal endothelium) and the iris.
 the posterior chamber between the iris and the front face of the vitreous.

Aqueous humour fills these spaces within the anterior segment and provides nutrients to the surrounding structures.

Some ophthalmologists and optometrists specialize in the treatment and management of anterior segment disorders and diseases.

See also
Posterior segment
Toxic anterior segment syndrome

References

External links
 

Human eye anatomy